The Humber Ferry was a ferry service on the Humber between Kingston upon Hull and New Holland in Lincolnshire which operated until the completion of the Humber Bridge in 1981.

History

The Norse-derived names of North Ferriby and South Ferriby suggest a ferry between them across the Humber Gap.

The first record of a ferry across the Humber dates from 1315 when the Warden and Burgesses of Hull were granted a charter by King Edward II to run a ferry between Hull and Barton in Lincolnshire. Pedestrians were halfpenny each, horses one penny and a cart with two horses twopence.

The Corporation of Hull purchased the leases for £3,000 in 1796 (£ in 2015) and both were relet in 1815.

In 1826 a new service started by the New Holland Proprietors between Hull and New Holland. In 1832 they launched a paddle steamer called Magna Charta.  In his A Picturesque Tour to Thornton Monastery, John Greenwood writing in 1835 records that the steam packet leaves Hull at seven, a quarter past eleven and four o’clock, and leaves New Holland at nine, two and seven o’clock in the evening.

In 1845 the Great Grimsby and Sheffield Junction Railway bought out the ferry services for £10,000 (£ in 2015). The Barton upon Humber service was withdrawn in 1851.

New Holland Pier railway station opened on 1 March 1848.

The management transferred to the British Transport Commission in 1948 and on 1 January 1959 management of transferred to Associated Humber Lines.

The Hull to New Holland ferry service finished on 24 June 1981 with the opening of the Humber Bridge.

Ships
This list is not complete. There was an additional ship introduced in the 1970s which was diesel powered, DEPV Farringford. She was previously used as a ferry between the mainland and the Isle of Wight.

The vessels operated by the Humber Ferry service – all paddle steamers to cope with the shallow shifting sands of the Humber – were:

References

Ferry transport in England
Humber
Transport in Kingston upon Hull
Transport in Lincolnshire